Milltown is a historic settlement and unincorporated community in Skagit County, in the U.S. state of Washington.

References

Unincorporated communities in Skagit County, Washington